Great Southern Railway may refer to:

Journey Beyond, operator of The Ghan, Indian Pacific and The Overland interstate passenger trains in Australia
Great Southern Railway (South Gippsland), former railway serving the South Gippsland region in Victoria, Australia
Great Southern Railway (Western Australia), railway branch from Northam to Albany in Western Australia
Great Southern Railways (Ireland)

See also 
Great Southern (disambiguation)
GSR (disambiguation)
Southern Railway (disambiguation)